Kampela Katumba is a Zambian footballer. He competed in the men's tournament at the 1980 Summer Olympics.

References

External links
 
 
 

Year of birth missing (living people)
Living people
Zambian footballers
Zambia international footballers
Olympic footballers of Zambia
Footballers at the 1980 Summer Olympics
Place of birth missing (living people)
Association football defenders
Green Buffaloes F.C. players